Aegilia is a genus of moths of the family Noctuidae.

Species
 Aegilia describens Walker, [1858]
 Aegilia indescribens Prout, 1922

References
 Aegilia  at Markku Savela's Lepidoptera and some other life forms
 Natural History Museum Lepidoptera genus database

Stictopterinae
Noctuoidea genera